The New Mexico Office of African American Affairs is a state agency in New Mexico tasked with advising education, community and economic development, and healthcare for African Americans in New Mexico. The office was established in 1999 by the New Mexico Legislature through House Bill 909. Then-Governor Gary Johnson later created an executive advisory committee through executive order. The agency is managed by the Director of the Office of African American Affairs, a position appointed by the Governor of New Mexico.

In June 2020, the director of the agency resigned from his position.

References

External link

State agencies of New Mexico